Saigon cinnamon (Cinnamomum loureiroi, also known as Vietnamese cinnamon or Vietnamese cassia and quế trà my, quế thanh, or " quế trà bồng" in Vietnam) is an evergreen tree indigenous to mainland Southeast Asia. Saigon cinnamon is more closely related to cassia (C. cassia) than to Ceylon cinnamon (C. verum), though in the same genus as both. Saigon cinnamon has 1-5% essential oil content and 25% cinnamaldehyde in essential oil. Consequently, among the species, Saigon cinnamon commands a relatively high price.

The scientific name was originally spelled as Cinnamomum loureirii, but because the species is named after the botanist João de Loureiro, this is to be treated under the ICN as an orthographic error for the correctly derived spelling of loureiroi.

Saigon cinnamon contains the second highest amount of coumarin of all the four Cinnamomum species sold as cinnamon, with one study detecting 6.97 g/kg in an authenticated sample.  Coumarin is moderately toxic to the liver and kidneys, and minor neurological dysfunction was found in children exposed to coumarin during pregnancy.

Production and uses
Saigon cinnamon is produced primarily in Vietnam, both for domestic use and export. The Vietnam War disrupted production, but since the beginning of the early 21st century, Vietnam has resumed export of the spice, including to the United States, where it was unavailable for nearly 20 years. Although it is called Saigon cinnamon, it is not produced in the area around the southern city of Ho Chi Minh City (formerly Saigon), but instead in the Central Highlands regions of the country, particularly the Quảng Ngãi Province of central Vietnam.

Saigon cinnamon is used primarily for its aromatic bark, which has a taste quite similar to that of C. cassia, but with a more pronounced and complex aroma.

In Vietnamese cuisine, Saigon cinnamon bark is an important ingredient in the broth used to make phở, a popular noodle soup dish.

Gallery

See also
Cinnamon
Cinnamomum
Cinnamomum cassia
Cinnamomum tamala

References

External links

Vietnamese cinnamon (Cinnamomum loureirii Nees.) page from Gernot Katzer's Spice Pages

Cinnamomum
Spices